Kotovsky is a rural locality (a khutor) in Bolshovskoye Rural Settlement, Serafimovichsky District, Volgograd Oblast, Russia. The population was 201 as of 2010. There are 6 streets.

Geography 
Kotovsky is located on the Tsutskan River, 43 southwest of Serafimovich (the district's administrative centre) by road. Bolshoy is the nearest rural locality.

References 

Rural localities in Serafimovichsky District